Thomas Cogan (1545?–1607) was an English physician.

Life
Cogan was born about 1546 at Chard, Somersetshire. He was educated at Oxford, graduated B.A. 1562-3, M.A. 1566, and M.B. 1574. He became fellow of Oriel in 1563. In 1574 he resigned his fellowship, and then (or in 1575) was appointed master of the Manchester grammar school. He practised as a physician at Manchester. Before 1586 he married Ellen, daughter of Sir Edmund Trafford, and widow of Thomas Willott, who had property in Manchester. In 1591-3 he was the family physician of Sir Richard Shuttleworth. In 1595 he presented Galen's works and other medical books to the library of Oriel, where they are still preserved. He resigned the schoolmastership before 1602, died in June 1607, and was buried on the 10th of that month in the church at Manchester. His will mentions property both in Somersetshire and Manchester, and bequeaths books to all the fellows and other officers of the college, and 4d. to each boy in the school. His widow died in December 1611.

Works
His works are:

The Well of Wisedome, containing Chiefe and Chosen Sayinges … gathered out of the Five Bootes of the Olde Testament …, 1577.
The Haven of Health, made for the comfort of Students …,''' 1584 (several later editions). With this was published A Preservative from the Pestilence, with a short censure of the late sickness at Oxford,Epistolarum familiarium M. T. Ciceronis epitome … (with an 'Epistle to all Schoolmasters,' the book being intended as an introduction to Latin). 

Wood also mentions:Epistolæ item aliæ familiares Ciceronis,Orationes aliquot faciliores Ciceronis.''

References

Attribution

16th-century English medical doctors
17th-century English medical doctors
High Masters of Manchester Grammar School
1545 births
1607 deaths
People of the Elizabethan era
People from Chard, Somerset
Alumni of the University of Oxford
Fellows of Oriel College, Oxford
16th-century English  educators
16th-century English writers
16th-century male writers